Clinton Joseph Davisson (October 22, 1881 – February 1, 1958) was an American physicist who won the 1937 Nobel Prize in Physics for his discovery of electron diffraction in the famous Davisson–Germer experiment. Davisson shared the Nobel Prize with George Paget Thomson, who independently discovered electron diffraction at about the same time as Davisson.

Early life and education
Davisson was born in Bloomington, Illinois. He graduated from Bloomington High School in 1902, and entered the University of Chicago on scholarship. Upon the recommendation of Robert A. Millikan, in 1905 Davisson was hired by Princeton University as Instructor of Physics. He completed the requirements for his B.S. degree from Chicago in 1908, mainly by working in the summers. While teaching at Princeton, he did doctoral thesis research with Owen Richardson. He received his Ph.D. in physics from Princeton in 1911; in the same year he married Richardson's sister, Charlotte.

Scientific career
Davisson was then appointed as an assistant professor at the Carnegie Institute of Technology. In 1917, he took a leave from the Carnegie Institute to do war-related research with the Engineering Department of the Western Electric Company (later Bell Telephone Laboratories). At the end of the war, Davisson accepted a permanent position at Western Electric after receiving assurances of his freedom there to do basic research. He had found that his teaching responsibilities at the Carnegie Institute largely precluded him from doing research. Davisson remained at Western Electric (and Bell Telephone) until his formal retirement in 1946. He then accepted a research professor appointment at the University of Virginia that continued until his second retirement in 1954.

 Electron Diffraction and the Davisson–Germer Experiment
Diffraction is a characteristic effect when a wave is incident upon an aperture or a grating, and is closely associated with the meaning of wave motion itself. In the 19th Century, diffraction was well established for light and for ripples on the surfaces of fluids. In 1927, while working for Bell Labs, Davisson and Lester Germer performed an experiment showing that electrons were diffracted at the surface of a crystal of nickel. This celebrated Davisson–Germer experiment confirmed the de Broglie hypothesis that particles of matter have a wave-like nature, which is a central tenet of quantum mechanics. In particular, their observation of diffraction allowed the first measurement of a wavelength for electrons.

Personal life
While doing his graduate work at Princeton, Davisson met his wife and life companion Charlotte Sara Richardson, who was visiting her brother, Professor Richardson. Richardson is the sister-in-law of Oswald Veblen, a prominent mathematician. Clinton and Charlotte Davisson (d.1984) had four children, Owen Davisson, James Davisson, the American physicist Richard Davisson, and Elizabeth Davisson.

Death and legacy 
Davisson died on February 1, 1958, at the age of 76.

An impact crater on the far side of the moon was named after Davisson in 1970 by the IAU.

See also

References

External links
Bloomington native won Nobel Prize in physics  - Pantagraph (Bloomington, Illinois newspaper)

1881 births
1958 deaths
20th-century American physicists
Experimental physicists
American Nobel laureates
Nobel laureates in Physics
Scientists at Bell Labs
People from Bloomington, Illinois
Members of the United States National Academy of Sciences
Fellows of the American Physical Society
Bloomington High School (Bloomington, Illinois) alumni